The Elbridge Hydraulic Industry Archeological District is a historic district in Elbridge, New York.

It includes a 16.7 acre area, with 4 contributing sites and 11 contributing structures.

The district was listed on both the New York State historic register and the National Register of Historic Places in 1982.

References

Historic districts in Onondaga County, New York
Historic districts on the National Register of Historic Places in New York (state)
National Register of Historic Places in Onondaga County, New York